Hume City Bulldogs Rugby League Club is an Australian rugby league football club based in Craigieburn, Victoria established in 2016. Previously known as Craigieburn Phoenix founded in 2008 the Bulldogs conduct teams for both junior, senior and women tag teams since the renaming of the club.

See also

Victorian Rugby League
Rugby League in Victoria

External links
 
 Craigieburn Phoenix Fox Sports pulse
 

Rugby league clubs in Melbourne
Rugby league teams in Victoria (Australia)
Rugby clubs established in 2016
2016 establishments in Australia
Sport in the City of Hume